Triprangode Siva Temple is a Hindu temple located at Triprangode, near Tirur, Malappuram district, Kerala. It is one of the most important Hindu pilgrimage centres in northern Kerala. Kokila Sandeśa of Uddanta Sanstrikal (15th century) mentions Triprangode among other major destinations in the region. 
Inscriptions of the Later Chera ruler Goda Ravi Varma (10th century) were discovered from the Triprangode Siva Temple. Later, the region formed a part of the Kingdom of Tanur (Vettathunad), who were the vassals of the Zamorins of Calicut. The main army led by the Zamorin camped at Triprangode during the Thirunavaya Wars of the 14th century.

History behind Triprangode Siva Temple 
Long ago, there lived a sage called Mrikandu with his wife Marudvati. Both were devotees of Shiva (He is the Eternal Lord. He is the Ruler of time Mahakaleshvara the Originator of time (Mahakala) and Destroyer of time (Kalari) or Kalasamhara Murti). The couple were childless, and so decided to perform austerity rituals so they would be blessed with a child. Then one day, Shiva appeared before them, Shiva asked the couple if they desired an ordinary and mentally disabled son who would live a long life, or an exceptional son who would live a short life up until the age of sixteen.
The couple chose the second kind.
In due course, Marudvati gave birth to a boy and the child was named Markandeya. Markandeya was an exceptionally gifted child, and became an accomplished sage early in his childhood. He was especially devoted to Shiva, and had mastered the Mahamrityunjaya Mantra. As the boy was getting on to be sixteen, Rishi Mrikandu and his wife became sad. Noticing this markandeya enquired about their sadness and they replied that at the age of sixteen, his time on this earth will come to an end, and so Yama, came to take his life away. The boy, Markandeya  then ran to Lord Mahavishnu (the preserver) but he was helpless and he directed him to Triprangottappan (Lord Shiva). On the way to Triprangode temple there was a huge banyan tree that stood by making difficulty to enter into the temple. At the time he reached there surprisingly the tree separated into two parts and then he could easily enter into temple. Markandeya hugged the Shiva Lingam and requested Lord Shiva to protect him from Yama. Yama threw his noose around the boy-sage; it encircled the Shiva Lingam too.

At a blow, the Shiva Lingam burst open with a thundering roar and a majestic, fiery form of Lord Shiva appeared out of the blazing light. Lord Shiva was very angry and asked whether Yama has these much courage to encircle the Shiva Lingam with his noose, Shiva struck down Yama with his trident (trishul), and Yama was no more. Markandeya was escaped from death. Shiva blessed Markandeya with eternal life and proclaimed that he shall remain forever as a sixteen-year-old sage. The assembly of Devas, who had witnessed all these, begged Shiva to revive Yama. Otherwise there will be a situation in the world with people live long without death. This would put unnecessary burden on the earth. Shiva then revived Yama, and declared that His devotees were forever to be spared from the noose of Yama. Since that day, the fiery form of Shiva that appeared to save the boy-sage Markandeya is called Kalasamhara Murti.

Temple 
The temple is one of the most important temples in Kerala dedicated to Lord Shiva. It is situated on the side of fields known as 'Vellottu padam', facing west. spreads over a vast area of around 6 acres, with many sub-shrines, trees and ponds. There is a huge banyan tree in front of the temple. Another major tree in the temple complex is elanji tree, considered very important to Lord Shiva. We can also see bael (bilva/koovalam), the most important tree of Lord Shiva, inside the complex. The main idol is the swayambhoolingam of Lord Shiva, facing west. There is a shrine dedicated to Goddess Parvati towards the left side of Lord Shiva. There are four more shrines dedicated to Lord Shiva in the temple complex. One is considered as the 'moolasthanam', that means the original seat of the Lord. It is called 'Karanayil Temple'. The other three shrines represent the three steps taken by the Lord to kill Yama. 

There are five ponds around the temple, among which three are in the temple complex itself. There is a pond in front of Karanayil Temple, which clearly approves the belief that it is the original seat. Very near to it, there are two more ponds, one named 'Santhikkulam', literally the place where the priests take bath before entering the temple, and the other named 'Vellottukulam', as it is near to Vellottu fields. The pond at the south-western corner of the temple is considered to be the place where the Lord washed his trident after killing Yama. There is a huge pond outside the temple complex in the north-eastern side. It is mainly used for public uses, for example : learning swimming, washing animals, etc. Devotees also take a bath here before entering the temple.

An interesting feature of this temple is that there are three types of sreekovils (sanctum sanctorum), which are commonly found in Kerala. The main shrine is a two-storied one in 'Gajaprishta' shape, literally meaning the shape of the back of an elephant, and is very large in size. It has a southward extension, which encloses the shrine of Goddess Parvati, thus having the concept of 'Ardhanarishwara. There is a 'namaskara mandapam' in front of the sreekovil, used by the Brahmins for reciting Vedas, Shiva Sahasranama, etc. Here, we can find the idol of Nandi, the vehicle of the Lord. There is an idol of Lord Ganesha on the south-western door, facing east.

Outside the main door, on the northern side, we can find the four sub-shrines of Lord Shiva mentioned earlier, and also a shrine dedicated to Lord Vishnu. The original seat, Karanayil temple, is a two-storied square shrine. The shrine at which the Lord took his first step is round in shape, and the other two are square. The shrine of Lord Vishnu has an idol in his usual four-armed form, with Shankha, Sudarshana Chakra, Gada and Lotus on his arms. Behind Karanayil temple, there are shrines to Lord Vettakkorumakan and Goddess Bhadrakali. All are facing west.

In the southern side, there is a shrine of Lord Ayyappa, facing west. Near to it, there is a stone statue of Lord Shiva as Mrityunjaya, that means the pose of killing Yama. The stone statue is the anthropomorphic depiction of the main deity. This idol was slightly damaged during Tipu Sultan's attacks. There are shrines dedicated to Lord Krishna, Snake deities and Brahmarakshas in the south-western side, all facing east. Lord Krishna is installed as 'Gosalakrishna', meaning the cowherd. Thus, his shrine is depicted as a cow shed here. The others have open shrines as usual.

References 
 Triprangode Siva Temple

External links 
 Official website
  

ml:തൃപ്രങ്ങോട്ട് ശിവക്ഷേത്രം
Shiva temples in Kerala
Hindu temples in Malappuram district
Kuttippuram area
108 Shiva Temples